Cundinamarca  may refer to:

Geography 
 Cundinamarca Department (1886–present), Republic of Colombia
 Free and Independent State of Cundinamarca (1810–1815 Estado Libre e Independiente de Cundinamarca)
 Cundinamarca Department (1820), Gran Colombia roughly encompassing modern Colombia, Panama, and the Mosquito Coast
 Cundinamarca Department (1824), Gran Colombia
 Cundinamarca Province (1851), Republic of New Granada
 Cundinamarca State (1857)

Biology
 Cundinamarca (moth)